Seven Slaves Against the World (Italian: Gli schiavi più forti del mondo; also known as Seven Slaves Against Rome) is a 1964 Italian sword-and-sandal adventure film, directed by Michele Lupo, produced by Elio Scardamaglia, written by Lupo and Roberto Gianviti and starring Roger Browne, Gordon Mitchell and Arnaldo Fabrizio. First released in Italy in 1964, it premiered in New York City, United States on August 18, 1965.

Cast
Roger Browne as Marcus
Gordon Mitchell as Balisten
Arnaldo Fabrizio as Goliath
Scilla Gabel as Claudia
Aldo Pini as Traidor
Alfredo Rizzo as Efrem
Giacomo Rossi-Stuart as Gaius
Carlo Tamberlani as Lucius Terentius
Germano Longo as Lucius Emilius		
Alfio Caltabiano as Gladiatore
Calisto Calisti as Selim

See also
List of Italian films of 1964

References

External links

1964 films
Italian adventure films
1960s Italian-language films
1960s adventure films
Films scored by Francesco De Masi
1960s Italian films